The Musée d'Orsay is a museum in Paris, France, on the Left Bank of the Seine.  It is housed in the former Gare d'Orsay, a Beaux-Arts railway station built between 1898 and 1900. The museum holds mainly French art dating from 1848 to 1914, including paintings, sculptures, furniture, and photography. It houses the largest collection of Impressionist and post-Impressionist masterpieces in the world, by painters including Berthe Morisot, Claude Monet, Édouard Manet, Degas, Renoir, Cézanne, Seurat, Sisley, Gauguin, and van Gogh.  Many of these works were held at the Galerie nationale du Jeu de Paume prior to the museum's opening in 1986. It is one of the largest art museums in Europe.

In 2022 the museum had 3.2 million visitors, up from 1.4 million 2021, but behind the 3.6 million visitors in 2019, due to the COVID-19 pandemic. It ranked fifteenth in the list of most-visited art museums in 2020.

History

The museum building was originally a railway station, Gare d'Orsay, located next to the Seine river. Built on the site of the Palais d'Orsay, its central location was convenient for commuting travelers. The station was constructed for the Chemin de Fer de Paris à Orléans and finished in time for the 1900 Exposition Universelle to the design of three architects: Lucien Magne, Émile Bénard and Victor Laloux. The Gare d'Orsay design was considered to be an "anachronism." Since trains were such a modern innovation for the time architects and designers alike expected a building that would embody the modern traits of this new mode of transportation. Gare d'Orsay instead gained inspiration from the past for the concept of the facade to the point of masking the cutting-edge technology within. It was the terminus for the railways of southwestern France until 1939.

By 1939 the station's short platforms had become unsuitable for the longer trains that had come to be used for mainline services. After 1939 it was used for suburban services and part of it became a mailing centre during World War II. It was then used as a set for several films, such as Kafka's The Trial adapted by Orson Welles, and as a haven for the Renaud–Barrault Theatre Company and for auctioneers, while the Hôtel Drouot was being rebuilt.

In the 1970s work began on building a 1 km-long tunnel under the station as part of the creation of line C of the Réseau Express Régional with a new station under the old station. In 1970, permission was granted to demolish the station but Jacques Duhamel, Minister for Cultural Affairs, ruled against plans to build a new hotel in its stead. The station was put on the supplementary list of Historic Monuments and finally listed in 1978. The suggestion to turn the station into a museum came from the Directorate of the Museum of France. The idea was to build a museum that would bridge the gap between the Louvre and the National Museum of Modern Art at the Georges Pompidou Centre. The plan was accepted by Georges Pompidou and a study was commissioned in 1974. In 1978, a competition was organized to design the new museum.  ACT Architecture, a team of three young architects (Pierre Colboc, Renaud Bardon and Jean-Paul Philippon), were awarded the contract which involved creating  of new floorspace on four floors. The construction work was carried out by Bouygues. In 1981, the Italian architect Gae Aulenti was chosen to design the interior including the internal arrangement, decoration, furniture and fittings of the museum. The arrangement of the galleries she designed was elaborate and inhabited the three main levels that are under the museum's barrel vault atrium. On the main level of the building, a central nave was formed by the surrounding stone structures that were previously the building's train platforms. The central nave's structures break up the immense sculpture and gallery spaces and provided more organized units for viewing the art. In July 1986, the museum was ready to receive its exhibits. It took 6 months to install the 2000 or so paintings, 600 sculptures and other works. The museum officially opened in December 1986 by then-president François Mitterrand.

At any time about 3,000 art pieces are on display within Musée d'Orsay. Within the museum is a 1:100 scale model created by Richard Peduzzi of an aerial view of Paris Opera and surrounding area encapsulated underneath glass flooring that viewers walk on as they proceed through the museum. This installation allows the viewers to understand the city planning of Paris at the time, which has made this attraction one of the most popular within the museum.

Another exhibit within the museum is "A Passion for France: The Marlene and Spencer Hays Collection". This collection was donated by an Marlene and Spencer Hays, art collectors who reside in Texas and have been collecting art since the early 1970s. In 2016 the museum complied to keeping the collection of about 600 art pieces in one collection rather than dispersed throughout other exhibits. Since World War II, France has not been donated a collection of foreign art this large. The collection favors mostly post-impressionist works. Artists featured in this collection are Bonnard, Vuillard, Maurice Denis, Odilon Redon, Aristide Maillol, André Derain, Edgar Degas, and Jean-Baptiste-Camille Corot. To make room for the art that has been donated, the Musée d’Orsay is scheduled to undergo a radical transformation over the next decade, 2020 on. This remodel is funded in part by an anonymous US patron who donated €20 million to a building project known as Orsay Grand Ouvert (Orsay Wide Open). The gift was made via the American Friends of the Musées d’Orsay et de l’Orangerie. The projected completion date is 2026, implementing new galleries and education opportunities to endorse a conductive experience.

The square next to the museum displays six bronze allegorical sculptural groups in a row, originally produced for the Exposition Universelle:

 South America by Aimé Millet
 Asia by Alexandre Falguière
 Oceania by Mathurin Moreau
 Europe by Alexandre Schoenewerk
 North America by Ernest-Eugène Hiolle
 Africa by Eugène Delaplanche

Collection

Paintings: major painters and works represented
Frédéric Bazille – 6 paintings including The Family Reunion,  The Improvised Field Hospital, The Pink Dress, Studio in Rue de La Condamine
Cecilia Beaux – Sita and Sarita (Jeune Fille au Chat)
Rosa Bonheur - Ploughing in the Nivernais
Pierre Bonnard – 60 paintings including The Chequered Blouse
Eugène Boudin – 33 paintings including Trouville Beach
William-Adolphe Bouguereau – 12 paintings including The Birth of Venus, La Danse, Dante and Virgil
Louise Catherine Breslau - 4 paintings including Portrait of Henry Davison
Alexandre Cabanel – The Birth of Venus, The Death of Francesca da Rimini and Paolo Malatesta
Gustave Caillebotte – 7 paintings including The Floor Scrapers, Vue de toits (Effet de neige)
Eugène Carrière – 86 paintings including The Painting Family, The Sick Child, Intimacy
Mary Cassatt – 1 painting
Paul Cézanne – 56 paintings including Apples and Oranges, The Hanged Man's House, The Card Players, Portrait of Gustave Geffroy
Théodore Chassériau  – 5 paintings (the main collection of his paintings is in the Louvre)
Pierre Puvis de Chavannes – Young Girls by the Seaside, The Young Mother also known as Charity, View on the Château de Versailles and the Orangerie
Gustave Courbet – 48 paintings including The Artist's Studio, A Burial at Ornans, Young Man Sitting, L'Origine du monde, Le ruisseau noir, Still-Life with Fruit, The Wave, The Wounded Man
Jean-Baptiste-Camille Corot – 32 paintings (the main collection of his paintings is in the Louvre) including A Morning. The Dance of the Nymphs
Henri-Edmond Cross – 10 paintings including The Cypresses in Cagnes
Leon Dabo – 1 paintings Moore Park
Henri-Camille Danger - Fleau!
Charles-François Daubigny - The Harvest
Honoré Daumier – 8 paintings including The Laundress
Edgar Degas – 43 works including paintings such as The Parade, also known as Race Horses in front of the Tribunes, The Bellelli Family, The Tub, Portrait of Édouard Manet, Portraits, At the Stock Exchange, L'Absinthe, and pastels like Café-Concert at Les Ambassadeurs and Les Choristes
Alfred Dehodencq - Boabdil’s Farewell to Granada
Eugène Delacroix  – 5 paintings (the main collection of his paintings is in the Louvre)
Maurice Denis – Portrait of the Artist Aged Eighteen, Princess Maleine's Minuet or Marthe Playing the Piano, The Green Trees or Beech Trees in Kerduel, October Night (panel for the decoration of a girl's room), Homage to Cézanne
André Derain – Charing Cross Bridge, also known as Westminster Bridge
Édouard Detaille – The Dream
Albert Edelfelt - Pasteur's portrait by Edelfelt
Henri Fantin-Latour - Around the Piano, A Studio at Les Batignolles
Paul Gauguin – 24 paintings including Arearea, Tahitian Women on the Beach
Jean-Léon Gérôme – Portrait of the Baroness Nathaniel de Rothschild, Reception of Condé in Versailles, La Comtesse de Keller, The Cock Fight, Jerusalem
Vincent van Gogh – 24 paintings including L'Arlésienne, Bedroom in Arles, Self Portrait, portrait of his friend Eugène Boch, The Siesta, The Church at Auvers, View from the Chevet, The Italian Woman, Starry Night, Portrait of Dr. Gachet, Doctor Gachet's Garden in Auvers, Imperial Fritillaries in a Copper Vase, Saint-Paul Asylum, Saint-Rémy, Self Portrait
Armand Guillaumin –  44 paintings
Ferdinand Hodler – Der Holzfäller (The Woodcutter)
Jean Auguste Dominique Ingres  – 4 paintings (the main collection of his paintings is in the Louvre) including The Source
Eugène Jansson – Proletarian Lodgings
Johan Barthold Jongkind – 9 paintings
Gustav Klimt – 1 painting
Maximilien Luce - The Quai Saint-Michel and Notre-Dame
Édouard Manet – 34 paintings including Olympia, The Balcony, Berthe Morisot With a Bouquet of Violets, The Luncheon on the Grass, The Fifer, The Reading
Henri Matisse - Luxe, Calme et Volupté
Gustave Doré - Master of Imagination collection
Jean-François Millet – 27 paintings including The Angelus, Spring, The Gleaners
Piet Mondrian – 2 paintings
Claude Monet – 86 paintings (another main collection of his paintings is in the Musée Marmottan Monet) including The Saint-Lazare Station, The Rue Montorgueil in Paris. Celebration of 30 June 1878, Wind Effect, Series of The Poplars, Rouen Cathedral. Harmony in Blue, Blue Water Lilies, Le Déjeuner sur l’herbe, Haystacks, The Magpie, Women in the Garden
Gustave Moreau – 8 paintings including L'Apparition
Berthe Morisot  – 9 paintings
Henri-Paul Motte - The Fiancée of Belus
Edvard Munch – 1 painting
Henri Ottmann - The Luxembourg Station in Brussels
Camille Pissarro – 46 paintings including White Frost
Odilon Redon – 106 paintings including Caliban
Henri Regnault - Summary Execution under the Moorish Kings of Granada
Pierre-Auguste Renoir – 81 paintings including Bal au moulin de la Galette, Montmartre, The Bathers, Dance in the City, Dance in the Country, Frédéric Bazille at his Easel, Girls at the Piano, The Swing
Henri Rousseau – 3 paintings
Théo van Rysselberghe – 6 paintings
Paul Sérusier – The Talisman, the Aven River at the Bois d'Amour
Georges Seurat – 19 paintings including The Circus
Paul Signac – 16 paintings including Women at the Well
Alfred Sisley – 46 paintings including Inondation at Port-Marly
Henri de Toulouse-Lautrec – 18 paintings including La Toilette
Félix Vallotton – Misia at Her Dressing Table
Édouard Vuillard – 70 paintings
James McNeill Whistler – 3 paintings including Arrangement in Grey and Black: The Artist's Mother, also known as Whistler's Mother

Sculptures
Sculpture was in high demand in the 19th century and became widely used as a way to display a person's social and political standings. The style and ideology represented by many of the sculptures were out of fashion by the mid-20th century, and the sculptures were put into storage and no longer displayed. It wasn't until the conversion of the Orsay railway station into the Musée d'Orsay museum in the 1970s that many sculptures from the 19th century were placed on exhibit again. The substantial nave inside the new museum offered a perfect area for the display of sculptures. During the grand opening in December 1986 of the museum, 1,200 sculptures were present, brought in from collections such as the Louvre, state loans, and Musée du Luxembourg. The museum also obtained more than 200 sculptures before opening though donations of art connoisseurs, the lineage of artists, and people
in support of the Musée d'Orsay.

Since the grand opening in 1986 the museum has collected works from exchanges that other museums or institutions once showcased such as Nature Unveiling Herself Before Science by Louis-Ernest Barrias that was initially commissioned for Conservatoire des Arts et Métiers, as well as The Thinker and The Gates of Hell by Auguste Rodin. The museum also purchases specific works to fill gaps and finish the collections already in the museum such as one of the panels of Be Mysterious by Paul Gauguin, the full set of Honoré Daumier's Célébrités du Juste Milieu, and Maturity by Camille Claudel. There are currently more than 2,200 sculptures in the Musée d'Orsay.

Major sculptors represented in the collection include Alfred Barye, François Rude, Jules Cavelier, Jean-Baptiste Carpeaux, Émile-Coriolan Guillemin, Auguste Rodin, Paul Gauguin, Camille Claudel, Sarah Bernhardt, Aristide Maillol and Honoré Daumier.

Other works
It also holds collections of:
architecture and decorative arts
photography

Selected collection highlights

Management
The Directors have been:
 Françoise Cachin: 1986 – 1994
 Henri Loyrette: 1994 – 2001
 Serge Lemoine: 2001 – 2008
 Guy Cogeval: March 2008 – March 2017
 Laurence des Cars: March 2017 – present

See also

 Paul Dubois (sculptor)
 List of museums in Paris
 List of most-visited art museums

References

External links
 
Virtual tour of the Musée d'Orsay provided by Google Arts & Culture

 
Railway stations opened in 1900
Orsay, Musee d'
Orsay, Musee d'
1986 establishments in France
Repurposed railway stations in Europe
Buildings and structures in the 7th arrondissement of Paris
Art Nouveau collections
Lists of painters
Orsay, Musee d'
National museums of France